Mikuš or Mikúš is a Slovak surname. Notable people with the surname include:

Juraj Mikúš (born 1987), Slovak ice hockey player
Juraj Mikuš (born 1988), Slovak ice hockey player
Matúš Mikuš (born 1991), Slovak footballer
Peter Mikuš (born 1985), Slovak ice hockey player
Rajmund Mikuš (born 1995), Slovak footballer
Tomáš Mikúš (born 1993), Slovak ice hockey player

See also
 

Slovak-language surnames